Lio Matoh (also known as Lio Matu) is a remote Kenyah Badeng longhouse settlement in the mountainous interior of the Marudi division of Sarawak, Malaysia, not far from the border with Indonesia.

Travel to Lio Matoh involves a four-hour 4WD drive from Long San, or it is possible to trek between Lio Matoh and Bario, but it takes seven to nine days. The Baram River begins as a stream near Bario, and it flows through Lio Matoh, the highest that small boats can navigate. It is possible to travel downriver from Lio Matoh by longboat: it takes two days to get to Long San by this method.

Neighbouring settlements include:
Long Pasia in Sabah.
Long Mio in Sabah.

References

Populated places in Sarawak